Euzetia occultum is a species of flatworm which parasitizes the gills of the Australian cownose ray and is the type species for its genus.   It can be distinguished from Euzetia lamothei based on its overall size and reproductive morphology.

References 

Monopisthocotylea
Animals described in 2001